Villa Santa Rita is a barrio (district) of Buenos Aires, Argentina. It is located in the western part of Capital Federal.

External links

 Barriada: Villa Santa Rita

Neighbourhoods of Buenos Aires